Islam is a minority religion in Botswana, a country dominated by Christians. Islam came to the country through Muslim immigrants from South Asia, who settled in the area during the British colonial rule. According to the 2001 census, there are around 5,000 Muslims in Botswana, which is less than 1 percent of the population. The relations between the different religious groups remain peaceful and friendly despite rising inter-religious tensions in the other parts of Africa.

The Shia population in Botswana is estimated between one and three percent of the total Muslim population of Botswana; according to Pew Forum it is less than one percent while as per Ahl al-Bayt World Assembly the population of Shia in Botswana is around two percent of the total Muslim population of Botswana.

History 

Indian Muslims were the first Islamic populations in Botswana when they arrived around the 1890s. These Indian Muslims were limited to urban areas by the colonial authorities. Within some brief time, Muslims established Islamic centres throughout one urban centre to another as cities and Muslim populations increased.

Malawian Muslims began to appear around the 1950s in Francistown. They arrived mainly for job opportunities like mining.

There were very few conversions to Islam until the 1970s. Shaykh Ali Mustapha of Guyana has since the 1970s proselytized in Botswana where missions are concentrated in townships and prisons.

Today, Gaborone is considered the heart of Botswanan Islam with a modernized mosque being built in 1982.

Mosques

 Lobatse Mosque

See also 

 Religion in Botswana
 Demographics of Botswana

References

 
Botswana
Religion in Botswana